American Refugee is a 2021 American horror thriller film directed by Ali LeRoi and written by Allison Buckmelter and Nicolas Buckmelter. It stars Erika Alexander, Derek Luke and Sam Trammell. Jason Blum serves as an executive producer through his Blumhouse Television banner.

The film was released digitally on December 10, 2021 by Paramount Home Entertainment and Epix and on March 10, 2022 by Paramount+.

Plot
The Taylors, Helen, an MD, Greg, an academic, recently born Mia, teen daughter Zoe and pre-teen adopted son Kai, have just moved to a spacious home in a rural area, miles from any city.

This idyllic situation is soon up-ended. The economy collapses, there are food shortages, schools close, there is looting and chaos. The country comes under martial law.

While shopping at the empty-shelved local market, Helen helps a scared young pregnant woman to pick some medical supplies. Later, an armed boy shows up asking for Helen. The boy, Matty, his father, Winter, and the market woman, Amber, live next door. There are problems with the baby and they need Helen's help.

Matty takes Helen and Greg to an underground fortified bunker. There, cranky Winter testily lets Helen examine Amber.

Even though Winter is paranoid, after their home is looted, the Taylors have to seek shelter with him. His bunker is their only option.

In this confined environment, arguing between Winter and the Taylors soon starts. Prepper Winter wonders how pacifist Greg could ever protect his own. The kids are caught in the middle of these tussles.

Eventually, Amber's baby is born, but there is no baby food in the bunker. Amber struggles to breastfeed so that job is now placed upon Helen, making it clear that she is becoming Amber’s replacement.

Winter finds a gun that Greg had hidden after attacking and killing an armed intruder. Greg is confronted by Winter leading to a fight. Winter ultimately banishes Greg and also from the bunker for not contributing.

The next day, Greg and Kai return and smoke out the bunker. Winter exists the bunker and locks his family and the Taylor’s inside as the bunker fills with smoke.

From the start, Helen knows the rules of Winter's realm, and that she has to keep her family on board, since much worse awaits outside. But maybe the danger inside is greater than outside.

Cast

Production
In April 2021, it was announced that Ali LeRoi would direct the television horror film American Refugee, written by Allison and Nicolas Buckmelter. The film is part of a partnership between cable network Epix and Blumhouse Television, which will produce eight films for the network. Blumhouse founder Jason Blum serves as an executive producer. In May 2021, Erika Alexander, Derek Luke, Sam Trammell, Peyton Jackson, Zamani Wilder, Jessi Case and Vince Mattis joined the cast of the film.

Principal photography began in April 2021.

Release
The film was released on December 10, 2021 by Epix.

References

External links
 

2021 films
2021 horror thriller films
2020s American films
2020s English-language films
American horror thriller films
Blumhouse Productions films
MGM+ original films
Films set in bunkers